The Whitewater River is a  river that flows south from headwaters in Transylvania County, North Carolina, over Upper Whitewater Falls and Lower Whitewater Falls before crossing into South Carolina and entering Lake Jocassee, the reservoir behind Lake Jocassee Dam.

In Lake Jocassee the Whitewater River is joined by the Toxaway River to form the Keowee River.  The confluence is submerged beneath the waters of Lake Jocassee.  Via the Keowee and Seneca rivers, the Whitewater River is part of the Savannah River watershed.

References

External links
 

Rivers of North Carolina
Rivers of South Carolina
Nantahala National Forest
Pisgah National Forest
Rivers of Oconee County, South Carolina
Rivers of Transylvania County, North Carolina
Tributaries of the Savannah River